Vladimir Vitalyevich Gusev (born November 24, 1982) is a Russian professional ice hockey defenceman who currently plays for Metallurg Novokuznetsk of the Kontinental Hockey League (KHL).

Career statistics

Regular season and playoffs

International

References

External links

1982 births
Living people
Amur Khabarovsk players
Chicago Blackhawks draft picks
Dizel Penza players
Florence Pride players
Greenville Grrrowl players
HC Sibir Novosibirsk players
Lokomotiv Yaroslavl players
Metallurg Novokuznetsk players
Norfolk Admirals players
Rubin Tyumen players
Russian ice hockey defencemen
Sportspeople from Novosibirsk
Yermak Angarsk players